Géssica do Nascimento (born 19 March 1991), commonly known as Géssica, is a Brazilian footballer who plays as a defender for Ferroviária and the Brazilian national team. She participated at the 2015 FIFA Women's World Cup.

Club career
Géssica joined her first football club Ferroviária in 2009, after she traveled to Araraquara to try out. She eventually became an important central defender and captain of the team.

International career
In May 2015, Brazil coach Vadão called 24-year-old Géssica up to the national team for the first time, as a replacement for the injured Bruna Benites. At the 2015 FIFA Women's World Cup in Canada, Géssica made substitute appearances in Brazil's group stage wins over South Korea and Costa Rica. After Brazil's second round elimination by Australia, Géssica remained in Canada as part of the Brazilian selection for the 2015 Pan American Games in Toronto.

References

External links

 Géssica do Nascimento  – 2015 Pan American Games profile

1991 births
Living people
Brazilian women's footballers
Brazil women's international footballers
Brazilian expatriate footballers
Brazilian expatriate sportspeople in Portugal
2015 FIFA Women's World Cup players
Women's association football defenders
Associação Ferroviária de Esportes (women) players
Expatriate women's footballers in Portugal
Campeonato Nacional de Futebol Feminino players
S.C. Braga (women's football) players
Pan American Games medalists in football
Pan American Games gold medalists for Brazil
Footballers at the 2015 Pan American Games
Medalists at the 2015 Pan American Games